Kainourgia Ego (Greek: Καινούργια Εγώ; English: A new me) is the sixteenth studio album by Greek artist Katy Garbi. It was released on December 22, 2008 by Sony BMG Greece and also is her first studio album since the 2006 release of Pos Allazei O Kairos. The album was supposed to be re-released with additional tracks, however, Garbi decided to release another full studio album instead.

Background
In mid-2008, it was announced that Katy Garbi was in the studio recording songs for a summer CD single and it would be a precursor to an album to be released in the fall. She stated that she would be returning to the pop music of her past and that the writer of all songs would be Pegasos. By October, everything had changed with no CD single released and with the announcement of Nikos Antipas taking on the role of composer on the album.

The album, titled Kainourgia Ego, will be a new approach by presenting a different Katy Garbi as justified by the title, which translates into "a new me". Garbi stated in an interview on Mega Channel's Mega Star that the album "is one of my greatest musical collaborations, with Nikos Antipas; everybody knows who he is, and with his experience, great work and enthusiasm, we have greatly increased the strength of this latest work, which will present a completely refreshed, new and desirable Katy Garbi and the end result will be nothing short of a success, I guarantee you!! (translated)"

Release
The album was released in Greece and Cyprus on December 22, 2008 and serves as the return of new material for Katy Garbi after two years following her 2006 release of Pos Allazei O Kairos. Succeeding her 2007 two-disc live album 18 Hronia Live, the 10-track album Kainourgia Ego will be Garbi's final release on her current contract with Sony BMG, which in total has spanned 19 years as of 2008. It was originally planned for the album to be re-released with additional tracks, however, Garbi decided on releasing a full-length studio album instead.

Promotion
The promotion of 'Kainourgia Ego' began in November 2008 as Garbi kicked off the winter season at Club Enastron with the first single of the album Afto Aksizo prior to its release. Within a month of its release, Alpha TV began airing a 20-second promotional spot of the album during its morning time slot showcasing various songs. Large promotional banners were erected outside of select Metropolis music stores nationwide informing of the album's release.

With the first music video "Kainourgia Ego" premiering on MAD TV, the music channel's website www.mad.tv and its affiliate the Katy Garbi official fanclub Garbofans.gr held a competition where members would compete by recreating the new album's cover art using selected images from its official artwork for a chance at winning a selection of albums from Garbi's discography.

Track listing

Singles
"Afto Aksizo"
"Afto Aksizo" is lead single of the album. The song, a slow Zeibekiko, was presented by Garbi at Enastron Music Hall on November 14, 2008 during her premiere with Notis Sfakianakis; the two will perform live at Enastron for the winter 2008–2009 season. Even though there were no plans to re-promote the first single "Afto Aksizo", Sony BMG Greece released a studio video of "Afto Aksizo" onto their Katy Garbi YouTube channel three weeks after the release of the second single "Kainourgia Ego" as a result of its continued success on the radio charts.

"Kainourgia Ego"
The second single is the title track of the album "Kainourgia Ego" and is a collaboration with Greek rapper Thirio. It was the first single to be made into a music video and is also John Mitropoulos' first music video as director. Mitropoulos is also the album's photographer. A "making of" preview was made available by MAD TV on January 19, 2009. The music video premiered on an episode of Alpha TV's Mad And The City, and was distributed to all television networks shortly thereafter.

"S'agapo Se Miso"
Announced nearly two months after the release of the second single, "S'agapo Se Miso" was officially proclaimed third and upcoming single from the album. The dance oriented song will be released as a radio single. In a radio interview on March 26 on Grevena Radio (Greece), Garbi stated that her third single, "S'agapo Se Miso" will also be released in remix form when it is officially issued to radio stations. On June 8, Garbi's birthday, "S'agapo Se Miso (Remix)" was released to all radio stations across Greece.

Personnel

Mastering - Thodoris Chrisanthopoulos at Fabelsound
Photography - John Mitropoulos
Costume Designer - Apostolos Mitropoulos
Hair - Stefanos Vasilakis
Make up - Thanos Molos
Jewelry - Kessaris
Artwork - Petros Paraschis
Sequence - Tolis Mihalis
Printing - Mihalis Orfanos
 Katy Garbi for Sony BMG – producer, arranger, vocals, background vocals

Release history

Charts
"Kainourgia Ego" debuted on Greek album charts at number nineteen. During its second week it moved up eight spots, placing it at number 11. It finally managed to top the chart in the second week of January 2009, and became Garbi's latest release to peak at top position on the charts.

References

2008 albums
Greek-language albums
Katy Garbi albums
Sony Music Greece albums